The 2007–08 season was the first and last season under coach Bert van Marwijk before becoming the head coach of the Netherlands national football team This was his second spell at Feyenoord after he had managed the team from 2000 to 2004. This season was not the best of seasons in the Eredivisie finishing only 6th. However, the club won a big price: the KNVB Cup, which was the 11th time they had won the cup.

Competitions

Overall

Eredivisie

League table

Results summary

Matches

KNVB Cup

Friendlies

Port of Rotterdam Tournament 2007

Player details

Transfers

In:

Out:

Club

Coaching staff

Kit

|
|
|

References

Feyenoord seasons
Dutch football clubs 2008–09 season